Al madiq may refer to:

 Al madiq, Al Madinah, Saudi Arabia
 Al madiq, Makkah, Saudi Arabia
 Qalaat al-Madiq, a medieval castle and modern town in Syria